Phillip James Ryan AM (9 June 1915 – 7 January 2014) was an Australian rules footballer who played with Hawthorn in the Victorian Football League (VFL). He was appointed a Member of the Order of Australia in 1991, for services to the community and sport.

Playing career
Ryan played his early football at Kew CYMS and was a member of Old Xaverians's 1938 premiership team.

He spent six years in the VFL, during which time he made 52 league appearances for Hawthorn, mostly as a ruckman and up forward.

His younger brother, Ted Ryan, played with Collingwood in the 1940s.

Administration
From 1948 to 1967, Ryan served in a variety of positions at Hawthorn, including Vice President, Chairman of Selectors and Treasurer.

Ryan was club President from 1968 until 1979, with Hawthorn winning three premierships while he was in the role.

In 1980, Ryan became the VFL's Commissioner for player payments.

Honours and achievements
Individual
 Hawthorn Hall of Fame
 Hawthorn life member

References

External links
 
 

1915 births
2014 deaths
Australian rules footballers from Melbourne
Hawthorn Football Club players
Hawthorn Football Club administrators
Old Xaverians Football Club players
Members of the Order of Australia
People from Kew, Victoria